"Get Low" is the debut single by American rap group Lil Jon & the East Side Boyz, featuring American hip hop duo Ying Yang Twins, released as a single in 2003. It first appeared on the 2002 album Kings of Crunk. "Get Low" peaked at number two on the Billboard Hot 100 and number 20 on the Hot Digital Songs chart. It was number five on the top Hot R&B/Hip-Hop songs of 2003. 
Outside of the United States, "Get Low" peaked within the top ten of the charts in the United Kingdom, the top twenty of the charts in Germany and the top forty of the charts in Australia, Austria, and New Zealand. It is also known as a breakthrough song for the crunk genre, as the song's success helped it become mainstream. It is listed number 99 on VH1's 100 Greatest Songs of Hip-Hop.

History
Three different radio edits of "Get Low" have been released. One had amended lyrics (i.e. "take that thang to the floor, you skank, you skank"), while the other two bleeped out certain profanities. Of the two bleep censored versions, one version left the word "goddamn" intact while the other censored the word.

The Ying Yang Twins used their lines from the song later in their song "Hanh!" from the album Me & My Brother, and in the remix of Pitbull's song "Bojangles". In addition, the line "bend over to the front and touch your toes" was reused in Usher's 2004 song "Yeah!", on which Lil Jon and Ludacris provided the rap vocals.

A version of the song, highly edited due to its subject matter and use of profanity, was featured on the Need for Speed: Underground soundtrack. A less-edited version was featured 9 years later on the Kinect game Dance Central 3. This song was also a playable track in the video game Def Jam Rapstar. The uncensored version appears in the Xbox 360 video game Def Jam: Icon. Lil Jon (without the East Side Boyz) appears in the video game as a playable character providing his own voice and likeness.

This song was also featured in the movies White Chicks, Coach Carter and The Proposal, where Sandra Bullock's character raps it. An abbreviated version of the song appeared in “The Mattress”, a season 3 episode of the scripted comedy series Brooklyn Nine-Nine. The song also makes an appearance in “Virtual In-Stanity”, a season 7 episode of the animated comedy series American Dad!, in which Stan Smith can be seen twerking to the song.

Remixes
Two official remixes were released in the EP Part II by Lil Jon & The East Side Boyz.
Remix – featuring Elephant Man and Busta Rhymes (also released as a single)
remix – featuring KRS-One, Snoop Dogg, MC Ren, Petey Pablo, Dr. Dre and DJ Pollo
Merengue Remix – featuring vocals by Pitbull
A mix of the song is featured as a blazing song in the video game Def Jam: Fight for NY
Also in the video game Def Jam: Icon
FreeStyleGames included a mix of the song with 50 Cent's "In Da Club" in the game DJ Hero 2.
Became an unofficial main theme in the fan community Need for Speed: Underground.

Chart positions

Weekly charts

Year End Charts

Decade-end charts

All-time charts

Certifications

References

Dirty rap songs
2003 singles
Lil Jon songs
Song recordings produced by Lil Jon
TVT Records singles
Ying Yang Twins songs
2003 songs
Crunk songs